Ripchord were an English four piece rock band, formed in 2004 in Wolverhampton. The band supported acts such as The Kooks, Babyshambles and The Kaiser Chiefs. They took their name from the Radiohead song ‘Ripcord’ with an added 'h'.

The band were signed to 1965 Records and released two singles - Lock Up Your Daughters (And Throw Away The Key) & Backstabber, the first of which was a limited edition single of only 1,000 copies.

History

BBC & 1965
It was not long before Ripchord had raised enough money from performing to record some demos of their songs at Mad Hat Recording Studios in Wolverhampton. These demos were sold at gigs and one was sent off to a search for the best young band in the West Midlands in 2005. This search was known as the School Of Rock and as made by the BBC. The search was eventually narrowed down to the six bands that celebrity judges, including Roy Wood and Janice Long, selected. The show concluded with a vote for who the public felt was the best band. Ripchord won this vote and gained the prize of funding for more demos and filming a music video. This gave Ripchord even higher exposure and the BBC asked Ripchord to play at a Children In Need concert at a later date.

It was at roughly the same time that one of Ripchord's demos was put on a CD featuring unsigned bands that was given to James Endeacott, the man responsible for signing The Libertines. Endeacott liked Ripchord's song and went to see them in Wolverhampton only to gain more interest with them. At the time they met he was just leaving Rough Trade but was about to set up his own record label 1965 Records. He asked Ripchord to sign to his new label to which they all agreed after no moment's hesitation.

The band are now defunct. Beal is currently a member of Splashh.

Members
Phil Wallbank – Lead Singer, Rhythm Guitarist
James Sullivan – Lead Guitarist
Tom Beal – Bassist
Roz Duignan-Pearson - Drums

Releases
So far Ripchord have released two singles. The first single, Lock Up Your Daughters (And Throw Away The Key) was a limited edition vinyl with only 1,000 copies made. The single was recorded in Elevator Studios in Liverpool and produced by legendary producer Ian Broudie. It was mixed by Steve Harris in RAK Studios, London. They received a considerable amount of airplay on Radio 1 for a limited release. and their video was shown to a large extent on MTV2. The video for the single was shot in London and features  Ripchord giving out flyers promoting their own single to passers by. 
The second single, Backstabber, was released on CD and limited edition vinyl. It was recorded at Parr Street Studios in Liverpool and was mixed by James Lewis at Livingstone Studios in London. Ripchord received glowing reviews from the NME about this single, calling it ‘the best riff this week by far’. The video for this single featured a much stronger plot line to its predecessor and was filmed in Ripchord's hometown of Wolverhampton. The shots in which the band are seen performing live in this video are filmed one of the first venues they played in, The Varsity.

External links
http://www.ripchord.co.uk

English indie rock groups
Wolverhampton
Musical groups from West Midlands (county)